Minuscule 59 (in the Gregory-Aland numbering), ε 272 (Von Soden), is a Greek minuscule manuscript of the New Testament, on parchment leaves. Palaeographically it has been assigned to the 13th century. It has complex contents and some marginalia.

Description 

The codex contains complete text of the four Gospels on 238 leaves (size ) with lacunae. The text is written in one column per page, 23 lines per page.

There is also a division according to the Ammonian Sections, but no references to the Eusebian Canons.

It was carelessly written, and exhibits no less than 81 omissions by "homoioteleuton".

Text 

The Greek text of the codex is a representative of the Byzantine text-type. Hermann von Soden classified it to the textual family Kx. Aland did not place it in any Category. According to the Claremont Profile Method it represents Kx text in Luke 10 and Luke 20. In Luke 1 it has mixed Byzantine text.

It has some unusual textual variants. In Matthew 23:35 phrase υιου βαραχιου (son of Barachi'ah) is omitted; this omission is supported only by Codex Sinaiticus, three Evangelistaria (ℓ 6, ℓ 13, and ℓ 185), and Eusebius.

History 

The manuscript once belonged to the House of Friars Minor at Oxford. In 1567 Thomas Hatcher gave it to Gonville and Caius College, Cambridge (not 1867, as Scrivener wrote). It was examined by Mill, Wettstein (in 1716), minutely collated by Scrivener in 1860. C. R. Gregory saw it in 1886.

It is currently housed in at the Gonville and Caius College (Ms 403/412), at Cambridge.

See also 

 List of New Testament minuscules
 Biblical manuscript
 Textual criticism

References

Further reading 

 F. H. A. Scrivener, "Adversaria critica sacra" (Cambridge and London, 1859). [as c]
 J. Rendel Harris, The origin of the Leicester Codex (London 1887), pp. 18–23.
 J. J. Smith, A Catalogue of the mss in the library of Gonville and Caius  College Cambridge, Cambridge 1849, p. 197.

13th-century biblical manuscripts
Gonville and Caius College, Cambridge
Manuscripts in Cambridge
Greek New Testament minuscules